Biko is a biography about Black Consciousness Movement leader and anti-apartheid activist Steve Biko. It was written by the liberal white South African journalist Donald Woods, a personal friend of Biko. Donald Woods was forced into exile for attempting to expose the truth surrounding Biko’s death. It was the inspiration for the 1987 film Cry Freedom.

Summary
Biko covers the life of South African anti-apartheid activist Steve Biko from the view of his friend Donald Woods. The book is also critical of the white government of South Africa and the Apartheid system. It attacks the mistreatment of blacks and the brutality commonly used by the police.

History
Biko died on September 12, 1977 while in police custody. The official police report stated that he had died as the result of a hunger strike. But South African journalist Woods, after first seeing the body, was convinced that Biko was beaten to death. Woods had photographs of Biko's body taken and published in his newspaper the Daily Dispatch. Woods was forced to flee for his life after he became targeted by the government for attempting to investigate Biko's death. He fled to the United Kingdom, where he campaigned against apartheid and publicized articles about Biko.

Cry Freedom
Richard Attenborough's movie Cry Freedom was based on Biko and other articles written by Woods. It stars Denzel Washington as Biko and Kevin Kline as Woods. The movie was not banned in South Africa, but the police confiscated copies of it, and theaters showing it were bombed.

References

Biko
Biko (book)
South African non-fiction books